A Book of Milliganimals is a children's book by Spike Milligan, first published in 1968.

The book has three parts; the first two, Animals and Milliganimals, contain humorous poetry and illustrations by Milligan of animals, both real and imaginary.  The third part, entitled The Bald Twit Lion, is a surreal, comedic story of a lion who loses his mane and his struggle to re-grow it and overcome his embarrassment.  His mane is eventually restored by God, who slides down to Earth from Heaven on a religious giraffe's neck.

References

1968 children's books
Works by Spike Milligan